Sir Thomas Wodehouse, 2nd Baronet (c. 1585 – 18 March 1658), was an English baronet and Member of Parliament.

Wodehouse was the son of Sir Philip Wodehouse, 1st Baronet, of Kimberley, Norfolk, and Grizell, daughter of William Yelverton. He was Member of Parliament for Thetford from 1640 to 1653 and served as High Sheriff of Norfolk in 1624.

Wodehouse married Blanche, daughter of John Carey, 3rd Baron Hunsdon, on 16 Jun 1605. She died on 6 November 1651. Wodehouse survived her by seven years and died on 18 March 1658. He was succeeded in the baronetcy by his son, Philip.

References

Year of birth uncertain
1658 deaths
Baronets in the Baronetage of England
Thomas Wodehouse, 2nd Baronet
High Sheriffs of Norfolk
English MPs 1640 (April)
English MPs 1640–1648
English MPs 1648–1653
People from Kimberley, Norfolk